Sanguié is one of the 45 provinces of Burkina Faso, located in its Centre-Ouest Region. In 2019 the population was 391,520. Its capital is Réo.

Lyele is a major first language in this province.

Education
In 2011 the province had 218 primary schools and 27 secondary schools.

Healthcare
In 2011 the province had 34 health and social promotion centers (Centres de santé et de promotion sociale), 3 doctors and 66 nurses.

Transportation
As of June 2014 Sitarail operates a passenger train three times a week along the route from Ouagadougou to Abidjan which passes through the province and stops at Zamo.

Departments
Sanguie is divided into 10 departments:

See also
Regions of Burkina Faso
Provinces of Burkina Faso
Departments of Burkina Faso

References

 
Provinces of Burkina Faso